Liberty Center can refer to:

Liberty Center, Indiana
Liberty Center, Iowa
Liberty Center, Ohio
Liberty Center (mall), a shopping center in Liberty Township, Butler County, Ohio
Liberty Center (Bucharest), a shopping mall in Bucharest, Romania
Liberty Center, a two building complex in Pittsburgh, Pennsylvania which includes the Westin Convention Center Pittsburgh hotel and the Federated Tower